Stannifer  is a small rural village, on the Northern Tablelands, New South Wales, Australia. The village is situated nine kilometres north of Tingha, New South Wales on the Elsmore Road and is within Inverell Shire. Middle Creek, a tributary of the Macintyre River is nearby.

The village is several kilometres from the locality of Old Mill and both are old tin mining villages with remnants of the mining past still visible in places and fossicking still carried on in local creek beds.

The main industries are mining, timber, fossicking and agriculture. Several varieties of gems can be found in the Stannifer fossicking area, including jellybeans, quartz and grass stone.

History
Stannifer Post Office opened on 1 October 1880 and closed in 1973.

References

"Inverell Shire Information", c.1981

Mining towns in New South Wales
Towns in New England (New South Wales)
Inverell Shire